This article is a list of US MIAs of the Vietnam War in the period 1966–67. In 1973, the United States listed 2,646 Americans as unaccounted for from the entire Vietnam War. By October 2022, 1,582 Americans remained unaccounted for, of which 1,004 were classified as further pursuit, 488 as non-recoverable and 90 as deferred.

1966

1967

See also
 List of United States servicemembers and civilians missing in action during the Vietnam War (1961–65)
 List of United States servicemembers and civilians missing in action during the Vietnam War (1968–69)
 List of United States servicemembers and civilians missing in action during the Vietnam War (1970–71)
 List of United States servicemembers and civilians missing in action during the Vietnam War (1972–75)
 Vietnam War POW/MIA issue
 Joint POW/MIA Accounting Command
 Defense Prisoner of War/Missing Personnel Office
 Defense POW/MIA Accounting Agency

References

Vietnam War
United States servicemembers and civilians missing in action during the Vietnam War (1966-67)
1966 in Vietnam
1967 in Vietnam
Vietnam War POW/MIA issues